Adrian O'Connor (born 11 January 1972) is a retired male backstroke swimmer from Ireland. He competed for his native country at the 1996 Summer Olympics in Atlanta, Georgia, where he did not qualify for the final in his two individual starts (100m and 200m backstroke). He was born in New Ross, Wexford.

References

External links
 

1972 births
Living people
Male backstroke swimmers
Irish male swimmers
Olympic swimmers of Ireland
Swimmers at the 1996 Summer Olympics
20th-century Irish people
21st-century Irish people